Kirk Pearson is a retired American soccer goalkeeper who played two seasons in the North American Soccer League.

Pearson attended Alderson–Broaddus College where he was a 1977 Honorable Mention (third team) All American soccer player.  In January 1978, the expansion New England Tea Men selected Pearson in the North American Soccer League draft.  He played only two games during the 1978 season, but saw five games at the beginning of the 1979 season when the first string goalkeeper Kevin Keelan broke his hand in the pre-season.

References

External links
 NASL/MISL stats

1956 births
American soccer players
New England Tea Men players
North American Soccer League (1968–1984) players
Living people
Association football goalkeepers